Seven Points may refer to:

Seven Points (Minnesota), an indoor shopping mall in the U.S. city of Minneapolis
Seven Points, Texas, a U.S. city

See also
Westminster, Texas, a U.S. city formerly known as Seven Points